Garmab (also Romanized as Garmāb) is a village in Deh Chal Rural District, in the Central District of Khondab County, Markazi Province, Iran. At the 2006 census, its population was 404, in 106 families.

References 

Populated places in Khondab County